This is a list of active and extinct volcanoes.

Wallis Islands